Gorgyra diva is a butterfly in the family Hesperiidae. It is found in Kenya, Tanzania and Zambia. The habitat consists of forests, forest margins and heavy woodlands at altitudes up to 1,500 meters.

The larvae feed on Rourea orientalis.

References

Butterflies described in 1937
Erionotini